J.C. Bermudez Doral Senior High School is a public comprehensive high school in Doral, Florida. It is a part of Miami-Dade County Public Schools.

Its namesake is Juan Carlos Bermudez, the Mayor of Doral. Its attendance boundary map includes central Doral and points west to the boundary of Miami-Dade County.

History
The Miami-Dade Public Schools Board of Trustees voted to name the school after Bermudez in June 2020.

It opened in fall 2020. Initially it only enrolled students in grade 9, but it would add another grade level each year. The founding principal, previously employed at Miami Springs Senior High School, is Ed Smith.

Feeder patterns
Eugenia B. Thomas K-8 Center and John I. Smith K-8 Center in Doral are Bermudez's feeder schools.

References

External links
 
 Profile at Miami-Dade County Public Schools

Miami-Dade County Public Schools high schools
Doral, Florida
2020 establishments in Florida
Educational institutions established in 2020